Blank Banshee 0 is the debut studio album by Canadian artist and producer Blank Banshee. It was released for free via Bandcamp on September 1, 2012.

Background and composition 
In 2010 Patrick Driscoll and Curtis "Cormorant" Ferguson began performing live as Blank Banshees (previously Shinjuku MAD) which consisted of "predominantly instrumental" compositions. By 2012 the duo had become a solo act, with Driscoll continuing to release instrumental music under the pseudonym Blank Banshee and Ferguson appearing as a recurrent guest vocalist.

Blank Banshee 0 was produced between 2011 and 2012 in Driscoll's hometown, Saint John, Canada.

In the summer of 2012 Driscoll made a move for the West Coast, seeking to escape the "bubble of economic and demographic slump" plaguing the creative industry of his Maritimes hometown at the time; he relocated to Vancouver, Canada, releasing Blank Banshee 0 shortly thereafter.

The album was released as a pay what you want digital download via Bandcamp on September 1, 2012.

Blank Banshee 0 was composed with an Akai MPD26 using Ableton Live. The album consists of largely 1980s and 1990s sourced samples layered over original beats, instrumentation and vocals. Several aspects of the album including song titles allude to computer technology. Many tracks blend trap style beats with elements of seapunk and vaporwave, such as OS start-up sounds and 1990s-era video game music. Exclaim magazine named "Teen Pregnancy" among notable songs featuring samples inspired by The Message by Grand Master Flash and The Furious Five. Commenting on his use of sampling, Driscoll states it "stemmed from a desire to separate myself from the guitar driven music I was making and listening to at the time."

Many songs on the album feature vocal and lyrical contributions by Cormorant, the stage name accredited to Curtis Ferguson. The song "Dreamcast" features a vocal melody by Ferguson from a Shinjuku MAD song originally released in 2010.

Blank Banshee 0 has been released on cassette tape, compact disc, vinyl, and USB flash drive independently through the online store Hologram Bay.

Reception 
Blank Banshee 0's "vaportrap" production style helped popularize vaporwave in the 2010s. The album's influence has since been attributed to a shift in the direction of the genre.

Esquire calls it "more approachable" than other vaporwave subgenres while building "on the basic premise". In 2016 The Fader called Blank Banshee 0 a "definitive document of the vaporwave era." Bandcamp Daily called the album "a progressive record, abandoning the often dissonant nature of vaporwave but emphasizing the more accessible elements, and incorporating beats characteristic of trap music."

In popular culture 
"Teen Pregnancy" became part of a viral video trend in 2016 called Simpsonwave.

Music from the album has appeared on the Netflix series Unplanned America.

In 2020, TikTok users shared their experiences with cyberbullying using the song "Teen Pregnancy".

Track listing 
Adapted from official liner notes.

Notes
 "Wavestep", "Venus Death Trap", "Hyper Object", "Photosynthesis" and "Dreamcast" feature words and vocals by Cormorant

References 

2012 debut albums
Blank Banshee albums
Vaporwave albums